The following radio stations broadcast on FM frequency 96.5 MHz:

Argentina
 Acqua in Pinamar, Buenos Aires
 Aire de San Javier in San Javier, Santa Fe
 Arequito in Arequito, Santa Fe
 Canning in Canning, Buenos Aires
 Classic in Avellaneda, Santa Fe
 CNN Radio Bahía Blanca in Bahía Blanca, Buenos Aires
 Del Sol in El Calafate, Santa Cruz
 El Portal in Rio Turbio, Santa Cruz
 Exitos in San Rafael, Mendoza
 Express in Villa María, Córdoba
 Infinito in Salta, Salta
 La Plata in La Plata, Buenos Aires
 Laguna in San Carlos Centro, Santa Fe
 LRI741 in San Guillermo, Santa Fe
 LRM408 in Arequito, Santa Fe
 LRM750 in Rafaela, Santa Fe
 LRP408 Music And Company in Balcarce, Buenos Aires
 LRS769 in Máximo Paz, Santa Fe
 Mitre Rosario in Rosario, Santa Fe
 News in Arrecifes, Buenos Aires
 Norte in Jáchal, San Juan
 Nueva Visión in San Gregorio, Santa Fe
 Paz in Paso del Rey, Buenos Aires
 Rafaela in Rafaela, Santa Fe
 Residencias in Mar del Plata, Buenos Aires
 San Jorge in Caleta Olivia, Santa Cruz
 Suquía in Córdoba
 Universidad Nacional de Cuyo in Mendoza
 WK in Chilecito, La Rioja

Australia
 Triple J in Griffith, New South Wales
3EON in Bendigo, Victoria
 3HHH in Horsham, Victoria
 3INR in Melbourne, Victoria
 Red FM in Geraldton, Western Australia
 96.5 Wave FM in Wollongong, New South Wales

Belize
KREM FM at Belize City; Carmelita Village; Santa Elena, Cayo District; Punta Gorda

Canada (Channel 243)
 CBF-FM-8 in Trois-Rivieres, Quebec
 CBTI-FM in Moricetown, British Columbia
 CBUF-FM-6 in Kamloops, British Columbia
 CBZD-FM in Doaktown, New Brunswick
 CFTX-FM in Gatineau, Quebec
 CHFR-FM in Hornby Island, British Columbia
 CHOA-FM in Rouyn-Noranda, Quebec
 CIPI-FM in Beauval, Saskatchewan
 CIRU-FM in St. Stephen, New Brunswick
 CIXN-FM in Fredericton, New Brunswick
 CJBC-3-FM in Penetanguishene, Ontario
 CJLY-FM-1 in Crawford Bay, British Columbia
 CJPG-FM in Portage la Prairie, Manitoba
 CJTL-FM in Pickle Lake, Ontario
 CKLJ-FM in Olds, Alberta
 CKMN-FM in Rimouski, Quebec
 CKRQ-FM in Whapmagootui, Quebec
 CKUL-FM in Halifax, Nova Scotia
 VF2213 in Luscar, Alberta
 VF2300 in James Smith Reserve, Saskatchewan
 VF7180 in Rockland, Ontario

China 
 CNR Business Radio in Jinan
 CNR China Traffic Radio in Cangzhou
 CNR Music Radio in Baoshan
 CNR The Voice of China in Qinhuangdao

Malaysia
 Nasional FM in Central Kelantan

Mexico
 XHARR-FM in Dr. Arroyo, Nuevo León
 XHBTS-FM in Bahía de Tortugas, Baja California Sur
 XHCUE-FM in Cuerámaro, Guanajuato
 XHCW-FM in Los Mochis, Sinaloa
 XHD-FM in Ixmiquilpan, Hidalgo
 XHDNG-FM in Durango, Durango
 XHEP-FM in Mexico City
 XHFI-FM in Chihuahua, Chihuahua
 XHITA-FM in Sonoita, Sonora
 XHJMG-FM in Cuernavaca, Morelos
 XHLUV-FM in Luvianos, State of Mexico
 XHMSN-FM in Cadereyta, Nuevo León
 XHOP-FM in Villahermosa, Tabasco
 XHPNOC-FM in Asunción Nochixtlán, Oaxaca
 XHRN-FM in Veracruz, Veracruz
 XHTLAX-FM in Tlaxcala, Tlaxcala
 XHZER-FM in Zacatecas, Zacatecas

Morocco
MFM Radio in Agadir

Philippines
 DWRJ in Tuguegarao, Cagayan

United States (Channel 243)
 KAJD-LP in Baton Rouge, Louisiana
 KBDN in Bandon, Oregon
  in Raton, New Mexico
 KBUX in Quartzsite, Arizona
  in Bismarck, North Dakota
 KCYS in Seaside, Oregon
  in Douglas, Arizona
 KDGW-LP in Grants Pass, Oregon
 KDHJ-LP in San Antonio, Texas
 KDUA-LP in Rogers, Arkansas
 KDZN in Glendive, Montana
  in Elk City, Oklahoma
  in Tulelake, California
  in Breaux Bridge, Louisiana
 KFXE in Ingram, Texas
 KGDQ-LP in McAllen, Texas
 KHMX in Houston, Texas
  in England, Arkansas
 KIKO-FM in Claypool, Arizona
  in Seattle, Washington
  in Julesburg, Colorado
 KJIV in Madras, Oregon
  in Fergus Falls, Minnesota
  in Soldotna, Alaska
  in Bovina, Texas
  in Cedar Rapids, Iowa
  in Tahoe City, California
 KLDK-LP in Dixon, New Mexico
  in Twin Falls, Idaho
 KLLM in Wheatland, Wyoming
  in Hobbs, New Mexico
  in Corpus Christi, Texas
  in Soper, Oklahoma
 KNRX in Sterling City, Texas
  in Sioux Falls, South Dakota
 KOIT in San Francisco, California
  in Lewiston, Idaho
 KPIK-LP in Stayton, Oregon
 KQIX-LP in Perryville, Arkansas
  in Rock Springs, Wyoming
  in Tulsa, Oklahoma
 KRBZ in Kansas City, Missouri
  in Grand Island, Nebraska
 KSLV-FM in Del Norte, Colorado
  in Audubon, Iowa
 KSOZ-LP in Salem, Missouri
  in Sparta, Missouri
 KUBU-LP in Sacramento, California
 KVCZ-LP in Brownsville, Texas
 KVKI-FM in Shreveport, Louisiana
  in Rochester, Minnesota
  in Evergreen, Colorado
  in San Diego, California
 KZAA-LP in Santa Barbara, California
 KZKY in Ashton, Idaho
 KZZE-LP in Fort Thompson, South Dakota
 WAKS in Akron, Ohio
 WASB-LP in Stanley-Boyd-Cadott, Wisconsin
  in Lafayette, Indiana
 WBBL in Richton, Mississippi
 WBFG (FM) in Parker's Crossroads, Tennessee
 WBHC-LP in Benton Harbor, Michigan
  in Fredonia, New York
  in Rochester, New York
  in West Pocomoke, Maryland
  in Chattanooga, Tennessee
  in Laurinburg, North Carolina
  in Lebanon, Ohio
 WFVR-LP in South Royalton, Vermont
  in Lanesville, Indiana
 WIGS-LP in Jellico, Tennessee
 WIGV-LP in Providence, Rhode Island
 WIHB-FM in Gray, Georgia
 WIMR-LP in Mcintosh, Florida
  in Savannah, Georgia
  in Columbia City, Florida
 WKDJ-FM in Clarksdale, Mississippi
  in Anna, Illinois
 WKIF in Holly Springs, Mississippi
 WKLH in Milwaukee, Wisconsin
  in Cloquet, Minnesota
  in Fort Lee, Virginia
  in Johnstown, Pennsylvania
 WLRE-LP in Elloree, South Carolina
 WLUL-LP in Thomasville, North Carolina
 WLWF in Marseilles, Illinois
  in Birmingham, Alabama
  in Bedford, New Hampshire
  in Malone, New York
 WNWX in Rhinelander, Wisconsin
 WOEX in Orlando, Florida
  in Biltmore Forest, North Carolina
  in Montrose, Pennsylvania
 WPOW in Miami, Florida
  in Dewitt, Michigan
 WRQY in Moundsville, West Virginia
 WRXD in Fajardo, Puerto Rico
 WSLR-LP in Sarasota, Florida
 WTDA-LP in Williamston, North Carolina
 WTDY-FM in Philadelphia, Pennsylvania
  in Amite, Louisiana
  in Hartford, Connecticut
 WVZC-LP in Toledo, Ohio
  in Williamson, West Virginia
 WYVS in Speculator, New York
  in Fort Walton Beach, Florida
 WZOX in Portage, Michigan
  in Farmington, Illinois

Vietnam
 VOV2 in Ho Chi Minh City, Voice of Vietnam

References

Lists of radio stations by frequency